Isoyama (written: 磯山) is a Japanese surname. Notable people with the surname include:

, Japanese aikidoka
, Japanese footballer
, Japanese gravure idol, television personality, actress and writer

See also
Isoyama Station, a railway station in Suzuka, Mie Prefecture, Japan

Japanese-language surnames